Mikael Ymer was the defending champion but chose not to defend his title.

Jiří Veselý won the title after defeating Norbert Gombos 6–4, 6–4 in the final.

Seeds

Draw

Finals

Top half

Bottom half

References

External links
Main draw
Qualifying draw

Internationaux de Tennis de Vendée - 1
2021 Singles